Veganuary is an annual challenge run by a UK nonprofit organisation that promotes and educates about veganism by encouraging people to follow a vegan lifestyle for the month of January. Since the event began in 2014, participation has increased each year. 400,000 people signed up to the 2020 campaign. The campaign estimated this represented the carbon dioxide equivalent of 450,000 flights and the lives of more than a million animals. Veganuary can also refer to the event itself.

History
Founded by Jane Land and Matthew Glover, the first event was during January 2014. In 2015 the project registered 12,800 sign-ups. From there the sign-ups grew to 513.663 in 2021.

The name "Veganuary" is a portmanteau of "vegan" + "January".

Programme
Veganuary is a crowdfunded campaign to issue a challenge each January promoting eating vegan for the month.

Participants sign up online and receive a downloadable "starter kit" and daily support emails. They're offered an online "vegan starter kit" with restaurant guides, product directories, and a recipe database. Participants are encouraged to share images and recipes to social media, which according to academic Alexa Weik von Mossner creates a sense of community and communicates the message that veganism is easy and fun.

Reception
Gentleman's Quarterly noted "it's a clever way to introduce a new way of nutritional thinking at a time of year where our mind is hardwired to explore ways to better ourselves".

A January 2019 slump in UK pub receipts was blamed on Veganuary.

Von Mossner notes that criticism can be raised over the fact that Veganuary uses "images with happy-looking, baby-faced animals while at the same time downplaying (though not completely omitting) the horrific truth about the lives and deaths of the actual animals that are nevertheless slaughtered everyday for human consumption". Another point of criticism may be "the campaign's strict emphasis on food rather than on other aspects of the vegan lifestyle and worldview".

Tobias Leenaert postulated the popularity of the campaign may be partially due to the organizers' decision to promote "trying" veganism for a specific period vs. "going vegan", which allows participants to decide not to continue with an all-vegan diet without feeling as if they've failed. Von Mossner agrees and points to the "light-hearted" and generally positive tone of the promotional materials, which feature attractive and "frequently named animals" with captions like, "Save little Eric—Try Vegan this January" rather than images of animal abuse.

Impact
Food businesses and restaurants in the UK have been introducing new vegan products in January to coincide with Veganuary. The supermarkets in the UK, including Tesco, have been seen to run advertisements advertising Veganuary. 

People in the United States are now participants in the challenge. In 2019, The Washington Post reported that "46 percent of people signed up for health reasons, with 34 percent citing animal cruelty and only 12 percent climate issues." In 2020, The Houston Chronicle reported that "Texas was the state with the second-highest sign-ups in the U.S." In 2021, The Maine Sunday Telegram reported that "Annual participation continues to be biggest in Britain, but it’s slowly spreading to the U.S., along with many other countries including Mexico, Argentina, Germany and Sweden."

In 2022, Veganuary published a deck of 40 inspirational cards called The Vegan Kit.

Participants
Participation in Veganuary has become increasingly popular, with the number of people signing up rising each year:

 2015 – 12,800 people
 2016 – 23,000 people
 2017 – 50,000 people
 2018 – 168,000 people
 2019 – 250,000 people
 2020 – 400,000 people
 2021 – 582,538 people
 2022 – 629,000 people
 2023 – 706,965 people

See also 
 List of food days
 List of vegan restaurants
 List of vegetarian festivals
 Meat-free days
 Meatless Monday
 Vegan school meal
 World Vegan Day
 World Vegetarian Day

References

External links 
 

Veganism in the United Kingdom
January observances
Charities based in England